Lydian Nadhaswaram (born 5 September 2005) is an Indian musician from Chennai, Tamil Nadu. In 2019, he appeared on The World's Best on CBS and won, earning a prize money of $1 million.

Early life
Lydian is born to Varshan Satish, a Tamil music director, and Jhansi as their second child. At the age of two, he started performing on the drums and at eight he taught himself to play the piano. He is a student of Augustine Paul, the Music Director of the century-old Madras Musical Association Choir.

Lydian spent 4 years studying at KM Music Conservatory, a higher education institution founded in 2008 by the AR Rahman Foundation. In a YouTube video Lydian was playing Vande Matram song by A.R. Rahman on the piano in front of Rahman in Lydian's house during a house visit by Rahman.

In September 2019, it was announced that Lydian would make his debut as a film composer with the Malayalam-language fantasy film Barroz: Guardian of D'Gama's Treasure, directed by Mohanlal, starring himself in the lead. He played the role of Guddu in the film Atkan Chatkan.

See also
 List of child music prodigies

References

Living people
2005 births
Musicians from Chennai
Pianist from India
Indian film score composers
21st-century male musicians
Child musicians